Lucile is an unincorporated community in the western United States, located in Idaho County, Idaho.

History
Lucile's population was twenty in 1960.

Climate
The climate in this area has mild differences between highs and lows, and there is adequate rainfall year-round.  According to the Köppen Climate Classification system, Lucile has a marine west coast climate, abbreviated "Cfb" on climate maps.

References

Unincorporated communities in Idaho County, Idaho
Unincorporated communities in Idaho